William S. Adams (1892–1930) was an American cinematographer of the silent era. He was the younger half-brother of J. Stuart Blackton, the British born film pioneer and co-founder of Vitagraph Studios. Adams worked with Blackton several times, but was also employed by other companies. He developed a reputation as a specialist in aerial photography, but his career was cut short when he died of a tropical disease at the beginning of the sound era.

Selected filmography

 The Juggernaut (1915)
 My Husband's Other Wife (1920)
 The Blood Barrier (1920)
 Man and His Woman (1920)
 Passers By (1920)
 Respectable by Proxy (1920)
 The Forbidden Valley (1920)
 The House of the Tolling Bell (1920)
 East Lynne (1921)
 The Wakefield Case (1921)
 Destiny's Isle (1922)
 Tides of Passion (1925)
Tricks (1925)
 Bride of the Storm (1926)
 Three Miles Up (1927)
 Sky High Saunders (1927)
 The American (1927)
 Won in the Clouds (1928)
 The Air Patrol (1928)
 The Cloud Dodger (1928)
 The Phantom Flyer (1928)
 Grit Wins (1929)
 The Smiling Terror (1929)
 Born to the Saddle (1929)
 The Sky Skidder (1929)

References

Bibliography
 John T. Soister, Henry Nicolella, Steve Joyce. American Silent Horror, Science Fiction and Fantasy Feature Films, 1913-1929. McFarland, 2014.

External links

1892 births
1930 deaths
American cinematographers
People from New York City
Infectious disease deaths in California